The 2018 Swiss Cup Zürich took place on November 18 in Zürich, Switzerland.  It was the 31st iteration of the event.

Participants

Results  
Source:

Prelims 

 the team advanced to the finals

Finals

References 

2018 in gymnastics
2018 in Swiss sport